Nasławice may refer to the following places in Poland:
Nasławice, Lower Silesian Voivodeship (south-west Poland)
Nasławice, Świętokrzyskie Voivodeship (south-central Poland)